Yerevan the capital and the cultural centre of Armenia is home to a number of professional theaters.

As of 2016, Yerevan is home to 21 theaters:

State theatres
 

Gabriel Sundukyan State Academic Theatre (1922)
Yerevan Theatre of the Young Spectator (1929)
Armenian National Academic Theatre of Opera and Ballet named after Alexander Spendiaryan (1933)
Yerevan State Puppet Theatre named after Hovhannes Tumanyan (1935)
Russian Drama Theatre named after Konstantin Stanislavski (1937)
Hakob Paronyan State Musical Comedy Theatre (1941)
Yerevan State Pantomime Theatre (1974)
Experimental Youth Theatre of Yerevan (1978)
Henrik Malyan Film-actor's Theatre (1980)
State Chamber Theatre of Yerevan (1982)
Small Theatre of the National Center of Aesthetics (1986)
State Chamber Musical Theatre of Yerevan (1987)
Yerevan State Marionettes Theatre (1987)
Hamazgayin State Theatre named after Sos Sargsyan (1991)
Metro Theatre of the National Center of Aesthetics (1992)
State Song Theatre of Armenia (1994)

Municipal Theatres

Hrachya Ghaplanyan Drama Theatre (1967)
Mher Mkrtchyan Artistic Theatre (1986)

Private theatres
Agulis Puppet Theatre-Studio (1988)
GOY Theatre of the National Experimental Centre of Performing Arts (1988)
Edgar Elbakyan Theatre of Drama and Comedy (1993)

Cinema theatres

Nairi Cinema (1920)
Moscow Cinema (1936)
Cinema Star (Dalma Garden Mall) (2013)
Hayastan Cinema (reopened 2015)
KinoPark (Yerevan Mall) (2015)

References

Yerevan
Yerevan
Theaters in Yerevan
Theaters
Theaters
Theaters in Yerevan
Theaters